Apatophysis caspica is a species of beetle in the family Cerambycidae, in the subgenus Apatophysis.

References

Dorcasominae